Itara is an Asian genus of crickets, and typical of the subfamily Itarinae.  Species can be found in India, southern China, Indo-China and West Malesia (including Borneo).

Description
The original paper states that the females have: "Body fusiform, tomentose. Head and prothorax small. Head shining, short, rounded in front, as broad as the fore border of the prothorax. Eyes moderately large, near the hind border, slightly elongated, not prominent. Third joint of the maxillary palpi clavate, shorter than the second. Antennas slender. Prothorax narrower in front, much broader than long; lateral keels well defined; sides slightly rounded. Cerci full as long as the abdomen. Anterior legs rather short and stout. Hind wings moderately long; tibiae with three spurs on each side; tarsi with the usual structure. Fore wings somewhat broad, extending rather beyond the abdomen; transverse sectors beyond the tympanum numerous and regular. Hind wings extending somewhat beyond the fore wings."

Species
The Orthoptera Species File lists a large number of species, grouped into ten subgenera:

 Itara (Bornitara) Gorochov, 1997
 Itara borneoensis Gorochov, 1997
 Itara chopardi Gorochov, 1997
 Itara copiosa Gorochov, 2007
 Itara kalimantanensis Gorochov, 1997
 Itara latipennis Chopard, 1930
 Itara sabahensis Gorochov, 1997
 Itara sarawakensis Gorochov, 1997
 Itara trusmadi Gorochov, 2007
 Itara (Gryllitara) Chopard, 1931
 Itara ampla Gorochov, 2001
 Itara curupi Gorochov, 2009
 Itara denudate Ma & Zhang, 2015
 Itara diligens Gorochov, 1997
 Itara pendleburyi (Chopard, 1931)
 Itara (Inditara) Gorochov, 2009
 Itara indiae Gorochov, 2009
 Itara (Itara) Walker, 1869
 Itara abdita Gorochov, 1996
 Itara aperta Gorochov, 1996
 Itara basidentata Ma & Zhang, 2015
 Itara communis Gorochov, 1997
 Itara dicrana Ma & Zhang, 2015
 Itara distincta Gorochov, 1997
 Itara kirejtshuki Gorochov, 1997
 Itara korotyaevi Gorochov, 1997
 Itara minor Chopard, 1925
 Itara mjobergi Chopard, 1930
 Itara palawanensis Gorochov, 2004
 Itara sericea Walker, 1869 - type species
 Itara tioman Gorochov, 2013
 Itara vietnamensis Gorochov, 1985
 Itara (Maxitara) Gorochov, 2001
 Itara kinabalu Gorochov, 2013
 Itara latiapex Gorochov, 2007
 Itara maxima Gorochov, 2001
 Itara megacephala Gorochov, 2007
 Itara parallela Gorochov, 2007
 Itara (Micritara) Gorochov, 1997
 Itara denticulata Chopard, 1940
 Itara minuta Chopard, 1940
 Itara (Noctitara) Gorochov, 1997
 Itara nocturna Gorochov, 1988
 Itara pacholatkoi Gorochov, 1997
 Itara sonabilis Gorochov, 1996
 Itara thailandensis Gorochov, 1997
 Itara (Phormincter) Saussure, 1878
 Itara finitima Gorochov, 2007
 Itara ivanovi Gorochov, 2008
 Itara johni Gorochov, 1997
 Itara kerzhneri Gorochov, 1997
 Itara major Chopard, 1930
 Itara melanocephala Gorochov, 1988
 Itara microcephala (Haan, 1842)
 Itara mira Gorochov, 2007
 Itara popovi Gorochov, 1997
 Itara proxima Gorochov, 1997
 Itara raggei Gorochov, 1997
 Itara similis Gorochov, 1988
 Itara uvarovi Gorochov, 1997
 Itara (Singitara) Gorochov, 1997
 Itara nigra Gorochov, 1997
 Itara singularis Gorochov, 1997
 Itara (Tinnitara) Gorochov, 2007
 Itara sympatrica Gorochov, 2007
 Itara tinnula Gorochov, 2007

References

External links
 
 Specimens of Itara at the British Museum Natural History.

Ensifera genera
crickets
Orthoptera of Asia